The Bileg Party (Ilocano: Bileg Ti Ilokano), also known as BILEG, is a local political party in Ilocos Sur.

In the 2019 elections, the party forged an alliance with Hugpong ng Pagbabago. Among its prominent members is former Ilocos Sur Governor and current Narvacan mayor Chavit Singson.

References

Local political parties in the Philippines
Politics of Ilocos Sur
Regionalist parties
Regionalist parties in the Philippines